Daghlah is a village in northern Syria located west of Homs in the Homs Governorate. According to the Syria Central Bureau of Statistics, Daghlah had a population of 410 in the 2004 census. Its inhabitants are predominantly Christians. The village has a Greek Orthodox Church.

References

Bibliography

 

Populated places in Talkalakh District
Christian communities in Syria